Slyne-with-Hest is a civil parish in Lancaster, Lancashire, England. It contains 34 buildings that are recorded in the National Heritage List for England as designated listed buildings.  Of these, one is at Grade II*, the middle grade, and the others are at Grade II, the lowest grade.  The parish contains the villages of Slyne and Hest Bank, and most of the listed buildings are houses, or originated as houses, and associated structures.  The Lancaster Canal passes through the parish, and eight bridges crossing it are listed.  The other listed buildings include a public house, three milestones, a hotel, a church, a pinfold, and a set of stocks.

Key

Buildings

References

Citations

Sources

Lists of listed buildings in Lancashire
Buildings and structures in the City of Lancaster